Eduardo Franco is an American comedic actor. He is best known for his roles as Argyle in Netflix's popular sci-fi drama Stranger Things, Theo in the coming of age feature film Booksmart, and Spencer Diaz in the mockumentary series American Vandal. He is also in the musical duo "Dumb Bitches w/ Internet" with Noetic Nixon.

Early life
Franco was born in the city of Yuma in southwestern Arizona to Mexican parents. He has described his upbringing as working class.

Career
Franco first started acting in a number of television comedies. He played the role of Gavis in the Adam Ruins Everything episode Adam Ruins Dating which aired August 1, 2017. His first major credit was as Spencer Diaz in the first season of the 2017 Netflix comedy  American Vandal. In 2019, he had a supporting role in the critically acclaimed comedy film Booksmart. He also appeared in several nationwide commercials, including spots for GEICO, Samsung, and TurboTax. In 2020, Franco starred in a lead role as Andrew in the Hulu movie The Binge.

In 2022, Franco gained notability for playing Argyle, a stoner friend of Jonathan Byers, in the fourth season of Stranger Things. Franco initially auditioned for the role of Eddie Munson.

Filmography
Film

Television

References

External links

Living people
American male comedians
21st-century American comedians
American male television actors
21st-century American male actors
American male actors of Mexican descent
Hispanic and Latino American male actors
1994 births